Jeffrey S. Scheidt is a United States Navy rear admiral who has served as the senior military advisor for cyber policy to the under secretary of defense for policy and deputy principal cyber advisor to the secretary of defense since June 2021.

References

External links
 

Living people
Year of birth missing (living people)
Place of birth missing (living people)
United States Navy rear admirals